Jitka Volavková (born 1939) is a Czech former professional tennis player.

Playing for  Czechoslovakia in the Fed Cup, Volavková has accumulated a win–loss record of 5–6.

She lost to the British player Ann Jones in the fourth round at the 1965 French Open. She lost to the British player Virginia Wade in the fourth round at the 1967 Wimbledon.

Career finals

Singles (5–6)

Doubles (4–7)

References

External links 
 

1939 births

Living people
Czechoslovak female tennis players
Tennis players from Prague
Universiade medalists in tennis
Universiade gold medalists for Czechoslovakia
Universiade silver medalists for Czechoslovakia